Rauma is a municipality in Møre og Romsdal county, Norway. It is part of the traditional district of Romsdal. The administrative centre is the town of Åndalsnes. Other settlements in Rauma include the villages of Måndalen, Innfjorden, Veblungsnes, Verma, Isfjorden, Eidsbygda, Rødven, Åfarnes, and Mittet. Most settlement in the municipality is located along the fjords and in the Romsdalen valley.

The municipality surrounds part of the southern end of Romsdalsfjorden and the Isfjorden and it also includes the Romsdalen valley and Romsdalsalpene mountains. In the lower part of the valleys and around Romsdal Fjord and Rødvenfjorden are driven agriculture with emphasis on livestock. The clothing industry has traditionally been a dominant industry in the municipality, especially in Isfjorden. In the summer, Rauma has a fairly large amount of tourist traffic. The top tourist attractions include mountain climbing/hiking, salmon fishing, Trollstigen, and the historic Rødven Stave Church.
 
The  municipality is the 61st largest by area out of the 356 municipalities in Norway. Rauma is the 140th most populous municipality in Norway with a population of 7,019.

General information

The municipality of Rauma was established on 1 January 1964 when the old municipalities of Eid (population: 381), Grytten (population: 3,683), Hen (population: 1,663), Voll (population: 1,163), and the southern part of Veøy (population: 1,400) were all merged to form one large municipality. On 1 January 2021, the  Vågstranda area in the northwestern part of Rauma was transferred to the neighboring Vestnes Municipality.

Name
The municipality is named after the Rauma River, which flows through the Romsdalen valley.

Coat of arms

The coat of arms was granted on 4 November 1983. The arms are blue and silver/gray representing the sky and mountains. The three mountains on the arms represent the three mountains of Vengetindane, Trolltindane and Romsdalshornet, all located in the municipality.

Churches
The Church of Norway has six parishes within the municipality of Rauma. It is part of the Indre Romsdal prosti (deanery) in the Diocese of Møre.

Geography

The municipality surrounds the eastern part of Romsdal Fjord, Isfjorden, and Rødvenfjorden, and it is south of the Langfjorden. It also surrounds the Romsdalen valley and the Rauma River from the mouth to the Oppland county border.

The Kyrkjetaket and Gjuratinden mountains lie in the northeastern part of the municipality. The mountains Romsdalshornet, Store Trolltind, Trollryggen, Store Venjetinden, and the Troll Wall are all in the central part of the municipality in the Romsdalsalpene mountain range. The mountains Karitinden and Puttegga are located in the southwestern part of the municipality. Part of Reinheimen National Park lies within the municipality.

Transportation
European Route E136, Norwegian County Road 63, and Norwegian County Road 64 all pass through the municipality. The Trollstigen road is part of County Road 63 in Rauma, and it is a famous tourist attraction due to the many hairpin turns on the steep road.

The Rauma railway line also runs through the municipality, over the Kylling Bridge, and terminates at Åndalsnes Station.

Government
All municipalities in Norway, including Rauma, are responsible for primary education (through 10th grade), outpatient health services, senior citizen services, unemployment and other social services, zoning, economic development, and municipal roads. The municipality is governed by a municipal council of elected representatives, which in turn elect a mayor.  The municipality falls under the Romsdal District Court and the Frostating Court of Appeal.

Municipal council
The municipal council of Rauma is made up of 27 representatives that are elected to four year terms. The party breakdown of the council is as follows:

Mayors
The mayors of Rauma (incomplete list):
2019–present: Yvonne Wold (SV)
2011-2019: Lars Olav Hustad (H)
1999-2011: Torbjørn Rødstøl (Sp)

Attractions
Rauma is frequently visited by tourists, especially due to the major sights:
 Trollveggen in Romsdalen valley
 Trollstigen road to Geiranger
 Rødven Stave Church (built around the year 1200)

Notable people 

 Mathias Soggemoen (1847 in Rauma – 1929) a railway worker and mountain climbing pioneer
 Kirsten Utheim Toverud (1890 in Veblungsnes – 1949) a Norwegian pediatrician
 Arne Randers Heen (1905 in Hen, Møre og Romsdal – 1991) a Norwegian mountain climber and member of the Norwegian resistance during WWII
 Nils Bølset (1928 in Veøy – 2015) a Norwegian diplomat in Germany, Turkey and Australia
 Oddgeir Bruaset (born 1944 in Rauma) a Norwegian journalist and non-fiction writer
 Ida Nilsson (born 1981 in Rauma) a Swedish long-distance runner, also competes in ski mountaineering
 Aksel Berget Skjølsvik (born 1987 in Åndalsnes) a Norwegian former footballer with over 250 club caps

References

External links

Municipal fact sheet from Statistics Norway 

 
Municipalities of Møre og Romsdal
1964 establishments in Norway